The Gregale  (Graigos) is a Mediterranean wind that can occur during times when a low-pressure area moves through the area to the south of Malta and causes a strong, cool, northeasterly wind to affect the island. It also affects other islands of the Western Mediterranean. The Italian name "Grecale" could be translated as Greek wind, as the wind starts at the Ionian Island Zakynthos.

See also
Bora (wind)
Etesian
Khamaseen
Levantades
Leveche
Marin (wind)
Maserati Grecale
Mistral (wind)
Sirocco

Notes

External links
Local Mediterranean winds 
Name of Winds

Winds
Geography of Malta
Italian words and phrases

pl:Wiatr#Lokalne wiatry nazwane